John and Caroline Stonebraker House is a historic home located at Hagerstown, Wayne County, Indiana. It was built about 1875, and is a two-story, "L"-plan, Italianate style frame dwelling with a bracketed hipped roof. It is clad in Dutch-lap board with wooden quoins at each corner. It features a wraparound Eastlake movement style porch added about 1890.

It was added to the National Register of Historic Places in 2014.

References

Houses on the National Register of Historic Places in Indiana
Italianate architecture in Indiana
Houses completed in 1875
Buildings and structures in Wayne County, Indiana
National Register of Historic Places in Wayne County, Indiana